Kamp is a Dutch and Low German surname. With the meaning "camp" (for any isolated cultivated piece of land) it can be toponymic of origin, but the name also originated as a patronymic, from the Germanic given name Kampe ("warrior; combatant"). Other, less common origins have also been documented.  People with the surname include:

Alexander Kamp (born 1993), Danish racing cyclist
Alexandra Kamp (born 1966), German model and actress
Christine Kamp (born 1966), Dutch organist and pianist
David Kamp (born 1982), German composer and sound designer 
Hans Kamp (born 1940), Dutch philosopher and linguist
 (born 1980), American basketball player in Europe
 (1786–1853), German industrialist
Henk Kamp (born 1952), Dutch VVD politician, Government Minister from 2010 to 2017
Ike Kamp (1900–1955), American baseball pitcher
Jim Kamp (1907–1953), American football offensive lineman
Joseph P. Kamp (1900–1993), American political activist
Jurriaan Kamp (born 1959), Dutch journalist, author, television personality, and environmental activist.
Karl-Heinz Kamp (born 1946), German football player and coach
Mischa Kamp (born 1970), Dutch film director
 (1927–1999), German historian and university president
Poul-Henning Kamp (born 1966), Danish computer software developer
Ragnar Kamp (born 1953), Swedish-American curler
Randy Kamp (born 1953), Canadian Conservative politician 
Ted Russell Kamp (born 1970s), American country singer-songwriter

See also
Van de Kamp / Van der Kamp, surname
Van Kamp, surname
Kamps, surname of the same origin
Kampf (surname), German surname meaning "camp"

References

Dutch-language surnames
Low German surnames